M. Abul Kashem is a Bangladeshi academic who is the Ex vice-chancellor of Hajee Mohammad Danesh Science and Technology University. Prior to this position, He worked as a consultant in 15 organizations on Earth Social, Communication, Administration, Gender Development and Quality Improvement in Higher Education. In addition to being the Head of the Department of Agricultural Extension Education and Language at the Bangladesh Agricultural University, he also served as the director of the Agricultural Extension Center (BAU AC), Agricultural Museum, Institutional Quality Assurance Cell (IQAC) of the same university. And he is the former president of Bangladesh Agricultural Society.

Early life and education 
M. Abul Kashem was born in 1953 in a Muslim family in Araji Sheikh Sundar village of Barakhata union under Hatibandha Thana in greater Rangpur district. He earned his B.Sc. Ag. (Hon's) degree in 1974 from Bangladesh Agricultural University and MSc (AG Extend Ed) degree from the Department of Agricultural Extension and Teacher Training of the same university in 1985. He earned his PhD in 1986 from Reading University in the United Kingdom.

In 1969 he went to the University of Wisconsin in the United States for advanced training in "Extension Education, Administration and Oversight." In 1997–98, he conducted post-doctoral research at Hiroshima University in Japan with a JSPS Fellowship. The research was conducted as a lead researcher on 15 research projects funded by the World Bank, British Council, DFID (UK), World-Fish Center, AAIDA Australia.

Works 
He published 34 research papers in international journals and 143 in domestic journals. He also published 25 research technical reports and 9 popular articles in Bangladesh Observer and Independent. He served as the Editor of the Bangladesh Journal of Extension for 4 years and as the Editor of the Progressive Agriculturalist Journal for 2 years.

Mobile veterinary clinic launching in Bangladesh 
Bangladesh's first specialised mobile veterinary clinic was launched by Hajee Mohammad Danesh Science & Technology University. It was inaugurated by HSTU Vice-Chancellor Professor Dr M Abul Kashem.
Farmers and cattle breeders in the area said they are grateful to HSTU for the initiative. One of them said service like this should be spread across the country.

References 

Academic staff of Bangladesh Agricultural University
People from Rangpur District
Bangladesh Agricultural University alumni
1953 births
Living people